Otto Räty (born January 2, 1992) is a Finnish ice hockey defenceman. His is currently playing with Lukko in the Finnish SM-liiga.

Raty made his SM-liiga debut playing with Tappara during the 2011–12 SM-liiga season.

References

External links

1992 births
Living people
Finnish ice hockey defencemen
Lukko players
Tappara players
Ice hockey people from Tampere